ISG Ltd (formerly Interior Services Group) is a privately-owned, London, UK-based construction company. It employs around 2,800 people, mainly in Europe, the Middle East and Asia, and has operations in 24 countries.

History
The business that became ISG was founded as Stanhope Interiors in 1989 by David King who led its management buyout from Stanhope Properties in 1995, when it was renamed Interior plc.

In 1997, the business, Interior Services Group, was floated on the Alternative Investment Market of the London Stock Exchange. It officially changed its name to ISG plc in April 2013.

In March 2016, it was taken private by US-based Cathexis (the investment vehicle of Texan billionaire William Harrison), previously a substantial shareholder, in a £85m takeover.

In May 2021, ISG reported its results for 2020, affected by the COVID-19 pandemic. Revenue was down 23% to £2.0bn (2019: £2.6bn); underlying EBITDA for the year was £37.6m (2019: £63.3m). Fit-out was ISG's biggest source of revenue (£1,042.3m in 2020), followed by construction (£690.8m) and engineering services (£293.3m).

In the year to December 2021, ISG reported revenues of £2.263bn, still not back to its pre-pandemic peak, while pre-tax profits increased to £18.9m, from £8.9m a year earlier; fit-out remained ISG's largest service line.

Notable projects
Renovation of Royal Festival Hall, London (2007)
Fit-out of St Pancras International railway station, London (2008)
Renovation of Zayed Sports City Stadium, Abu Dhabi, United Arab Emirates (2009)
Lee Valley VeloPark, London (2011)
Humber Gateway Wind Farm visitor centre (2013)
Seevic College (2013–14), notable for a legal ruling on the interim payment provisions in Part 8 of the Local Democracy, Economic Development and Construction Act 2009
Royal Mint visitor centre, Llantrisant (2014)
Wigan Town Hall restoration (2016)
BBC Cymru Wales New Broadcasting House, Cardiff (2019)
Waterloo International redevelopment, London (ongoing in 2021)
Lord's cricket ground, London: redevelopment of Compton and Edrich stands (2019-2021)
Cardiff Transport Interchange (due to complete in 2023)
New facility for UCL Queen Square Institute of Neurology and Institute of Dementia Research (due to complete in 2024).
Britishvolt gigafactory, in Blyth, Northumberland (construction started in September 2021 before being temporarily suspended in August 2022)

Notes

References

Construction and civil engineering companies of the United Kingdom
British companies established in 1989
Companies based in London
1989 establishments in England